Somanakoppa is a village in Dharwad district of Karnataka, India.

Demographics 
As of the 2011 Census of India there were 221 households in Somanakoppa and a total population of 1,086 consisting of 570 males and 516 females. There were 145 children ages 0-6.

References

Villages in Dharwad district